Susannah "Susy" Kate Pryde (born 15 October 1973 in Waipukurau, New Zealand) is a New Zealand cyclist, who won a silver medal for New Zealand at the 1998 Commonwealth Games in the women's road race.
At the 2002 Commonwealth Games she again won a silver medal in the cross country discipline.

References

1973 births
Living people
New Zealand female cyclists
Olympic cyclists of New Zealand
Cyclists at the 1996 Summer Olympics
Cyclists at the 2000 Summer Olympics
Commonwealth Games silver medallists for New Zealand
Cyclists at the 1994 Commonwealth Games
Cyclists at the 1998 Commonwealth Games
Cyclists at the 2002 Commonwealth Games
People from Waipukurau
New Zealand mountain bikers
Commonwealth Games medallists in cycling
Sportspeople from the Hawke's Bay Region
20th-century New Zealand women
21st-century New Zealand women
Medallists at the 1998 Commonwealth Games
Medallists at the 2002 Commonwealth Games